Cryptoditha is a genus of pseudoscorpions in the family Tridenchthoniidae. There are at least two described species in Cryptoditha.

Species
These two species belong to the genus Cryptoditha:
 Cryptoditha elegans (Beier, 1931)
 Cryptoditha francisi (Feio, 1945)

References

Further reading

External links

 

Tridenchthoniidae
Pseudoscorpion genera